We've Done Something Wonderful (stylized in all caps) is the ninth studio album by the hip hop group Epik High. The album was released on October 23, 2017, by YG Entertainment. It would be their final release under YG before their departure from the label on October 2, 2018. "Home Is Far Away" featuring Oh Hyuk and "Love [Story]" featuring IU served as singles from the album.

Background and release
On September 27, 2017, Epik High released a video, confirming their ninth album's title and release date. The video also revealed that South Korean singer, IU, would feature on the album. On October 12, a poster was revealed containing lyrics from one of the album's songs. The full album was released on October 23, 2017, with its first single, "Home Is Far Away" (featuring hyukoh's Oh Hyuk. The album's second single, "Love [Story]" (featuring IU) was released on October 27.

Reception
We've Done Something Wonderful peaked at No. 6 on the South Korean Gaon chart, and No. 2 on the US World Albums chart. Billboard gave the album a positive review, stating "Wonderful is a testament to the trio's place in the Korean music industry, with the band adapting and drawing on popular sounds while maintaining their unique identity as an act that weighs its music with introspective lyrics. Contemplatively inspirational and dreary, it is a mature album that -- while perhaps less fun and pop-ish than Shoebox -- seems to return Epik to a more introverted space, inspired by the what they've faced over their nearly decade and a half as one of Korea's most prominent hip-hop teams."

Tracklist
Credits adapted from Melon.

Notes

Charts

References

2018 albums
Epik High albums
YG Entertainment albums